The 2013 Bangladesh Federation Cup was the 26th edition to be played and was known as the Walton Federation Cup due to sponsorship reasons.

The competition started on 21 November and finished with the final at the Bangabandhu National Stadium on 9 December.

Twelve teams took part with the first round being played as a group stage; all groups contained three teams. The top two sides from each group qualified for the knock-out stages.

Group stage

Group A

Group B

Group C

Group D

Quarter finals

Semi finals

Final

References

2013
2013 in Bangladeshi football